The 2007 Pot Black was a professional non-ranking snooker tournament that was held on 6 October 2007 at the Sheffield City Hall in Sheffield, England. All matches were played over one .

Ken Doherty became the first Irish Pot Black champion by defeating Shaun Murphy 1–0 (71–36) in the final. The two-time world champion Ronnie O'Sullivan turned down an invitation to participate in the tournament, citing "personal commitments". This was the last edition of Pot Black to be staged

Main draw
Players highlighted in bold denote match winners.

References

2007
Pot Black
Pot Black